Alpha (stylized in all caps) is the debut studio album by South Korean rapper and singer-songwriter CL. Produced under her self-managed label Very Cherry, Alpha marks CL's first full-length work as a solo artist since her career debut in 2009. The album was preceded by the release of several singles, and was released on October 20, 2021.

Background and production
Well known as a member and leader of K-pop group 2NE1, CL left her longtime label YG Entertainment after 12 years in December 2019. Shortly after departing from the label, she released her first project extended play In the Name of Love as an independent artist. A shift from her traditional urban image, the record explored a variety of musical styles from alternative R&B, tropical dance, rap, and ballads. In September 2020, CL released the music video for the intro to her upcoming full-length album Alpha, titled "Post Up". Subsequently, it was announced that album would be preceded with the release of the songs "Hwa" and "5 Star". 

At the same time, CL had originally intended for her full-length debut record to be released on November 30, 2020; however, it was later announced that the album's release would be postponed to the first half of 2021 in order to make further improvements. On August 13, it was announced that CL would release her album Alpha in October 2021. The first single "Spicy" was first released on August 24, while the second single "Lover Like Me" was released on September 29. "Tie a Cherry" was released in conjunction with Alpha on October 20.

Composition

Music and concept
Writing for Billboard, Owen Meyers asserted that the release of Alpha "embraces her status as an outlier of the international pop scene, with hooky pop-R&B hybrids, avant-garde electronic touches and distorted, speaker-busting hip-hop that stand apart from the glossy acts for which she helped paved the way." In her May 2021 cover story for Allure, the magazine explained that album's meaning is twofold: "It’s about the alpha-female character she embodies, but it also suggests a new beginning", and added that "the songs will fill out CL’s superlative branding with personal flavor." Upon the album's release, CL said that "I didn’t have any features on this album because I wanted [to introduce] all the different characters of CL".

Songs
Identified as CL's return to the global stage, Tim Chan of Rolling Stone regarded the hip-hop track "Hwa" as a "sassy kiss-off" and a "declaration of independence". An "identity peace song"—as CL describes, the title embodies multiple meanings in both Korean and Chinese, including themes of fire, flower, change, and wealth. Stylistically, "Hwa" interpolates chants, slinky synths, and snappy snares into a booming bass line. The musical styles of "5 Star" heavily contrasts its counterpart; it is characterized as a slow-jam love-filled number that primarily features the singer's soft vocals in both Korean and English, and contains greater influences from pop music. The song's lyrical content revolves around love and the rollercoaster of emotions felt during a romantic relationship.

Reception

NMEs Carmen Chin gave Alpha a four out of five rating, where she complimented the album's musical styles, experimentation, and vocal delivery. Christina Lee from NPR said that "Years after she introduced herself as 'the Baddest Female,' she maintains her role as an 언니 (eonni), or the older sister, of this cross-cultural moment in today's pop music." Writing for Rolling Stone, Krstine Kwak wrote that although the themes presented in the album were comparable to CL's previous releases, "sonically, these tracks show a new side to her range, with a bigger focus on vocals, storytelling, and lyricism, adding to the rap capabilities she's shown over the years. Alpha solidifies a fresh start that won’t leave her old fans in the dust."

Track listing

Charts

Weekly charts

Monthly charts

Release history

References

K-pop albums
2021 debut albums